The Mothers of the Plaza de Mayo is an Argentine human rights association formed in response to the National Reorganization Process, the military dictatorship by Jorge Rafael Videla, with the goal of finding the desaparecidos, initially, and then determining the culprits of crimes against humanity to promote their trial and sentencing.

The Mothers began demonstrating in the Plaza de Mayo, the public square located in front of the Casa Rosada presidential palace, in the city of Buenos Aires, on April 30, 1977, to petition for the alive reappearance of their disappeared children. Originally, they would remain there seated, but by declaring state of emergency, police expelled them from the public square.

In September 1977, in order to provide themselves with an opportunity to share their stories with other Argentinians, the mothers decided to join the annual pilgrimage to Our Lady of Luján, located 30 miles outside Buenos Aires. In order to stand out among the crowds, the mothers decided to wear their children's nappies (diapers) as headscarves. Following the pilgrimage, the mothers decided to continue wearing these headscarves during their meetings and weekly demonstrations at the Plaza. On them, they embroidered the names of their children and wrote “Aparición con Vida” (Alive reappearance). 

During the years of the Dirty war, the name used by the military junta in Argentina from 1976 to 1983 as a part of Operation Condor, military and security forces and right-wing death squads in the form of the Argentine Anticommunist Alliance (AAA, or Triple A) hunted down political dissidents and anyone believed to be associated with socialism, left-wing Peronism or the Montoneros guerrillero movement. The Mothers constantly opposed the de facto government and suffered persecution, including kidnappings and forced disappearances, most notably in the cases of founders Azucena Villaflor, Esther Ballestrino, María Ponce de Bianco, and French nun supporters Alice Domon and Léonie Duquet, perpetrated by a group led by Alfredo Astiz, a former commander, intelligence officer, and naval commando who served in the Argentine Navy during the military dictatorship. The Argentine Forensic Anthropology Team, known for having found and identified the remains of Che Guevara, would later find their bodies to have been killed on a death flight and their bodies disposed of in the sea.

On the first days of December, 1980, the first "March of Resistance" was held, consisting of marching around the public square for 24 hours.

Despite democracy being reestablished in the 1983 general election, the movement continued to hold marches and demonstrations, demanding sentences for the military personnel that participated in the government that overthrew Isabel Perón in the 1976 coup d'état. This would eventually culminate in the Trial of the Juntas of 1985.

They have received widespread support and recognition by many international organizations, including being the first organization laureated by the Sakharov Prize for Freedom of Thought, and helped several human rights groups throughout their history. The 1980 Nobel Peace Prize recipient Adolfo Pérez Esquivel was an active supporter of the association, for which he was the subject of harassment by the dictatorship.

Since 1986 the Mothers of the Plaza de Mayo have been divided into two factions, the majority group "Mothers of the Plaza de Mayo Association" (presided by Hebe de Bonafini) and "Mothers of the Plaza de Mayo — Founding Line". Ceremonially, every Thursday at 3:30 p.m the Mothers of the Plaza de Mayo, led by Hebe de Bonafini, march around the May Pyramid at the central hub of the Plaza de Mayo, and at 4:00 p.m they give speeches from the Equestrian monument to General Manuel Belgrano, where they opine over the current national and global situation.

Purpose 
Women had organized to gather, holding a vigil, while also trying to learn what had happened to their adult children during the 1970s and 1980s. They began to gather for this every Thursday, from 1977 at the Plaza de Mayo in Buenos Aires, in front of the Casa Rosada presidential palace, in public defiance of the government's law against mass assemblies.  Wearing white headscarves to symbolize the diapers (nappies) of their lost children, embroidered with the names and dates of birth of their offspring, now young adults, the mothers marched in twos in solidarity to protest the denials of their children's existence or their mistreatment by the military regime.  Despite personal risks, they wanted to hold the government accountable for the human rights violations which were committed in the Dirty War.

Activism and reaction 

The Mothers of the Plaza de Mayo were the first major group to organize against the Argentina regime's human rights violations. Together, the women created a dynamic and unexpected force, which existed in opposition to traditional constraints on women in Latin America. These mothers came together to push for information on their own children and this highlighted the human rights violations and the scale of the protest drew press attention, raising awareness on a local and global scale. Their persistence to publicly remember and try to find their children, the sustained group organisation, the use of symbols and slogans, and the silent weekly protests attracted reactive measures from those in power.

The military government considered these women to be politically subversive; the founder of the Mothers of the Plaza de Mayo, Azucena Villaflor De Vincenti, who placed the names of 'the missing' in a newspaper in December 1977 (on International Human Rights Day) was kidnapped, tortured and murdered (later found to have been killed on a 'death flight' and her body disposed of in the sea), along with French nuns Alice Domon and Léonie Duquet who also supported the movement. This was done at the command of Alfredo Astiz and Jorge Rafael Videla (who was a senior commander in the Argentine Army and dictator of Argentina from 1976 to 1981), both of whom were later sentenced to life in prison for their roles in the repression of dissidents during the Dirty War.

Esther Ballestrino and María Ponce de Bianco, two other founders of the Mothers of the Plaza de Mayo, also "disappeared".

In 1983, former military officers began to reveal information about some of the regime's human rights violations. Eventually, the military has admitted that over 9,000 of those abducted are still unaccounted for, but the Mothers of the Plaza de Mayo say that the number of missing is closer to 30,000. Most are presumed dead. Many of these prisoners were high school students, young professionals, and union workers who were suspected of having opposed the government. Those 'taken' were generally below the age of 35, as were the members of the regime who tortured and murdered them. There were a disproportionate number of Jewish "disappeared" as the military was anti-Semitic, as documented in Prisoner Without a Name, Cell Without a Number. This documented the testimony of Jacobo Timerman and his experience being arrested and tortured during this time.

It took until 2005 and DNA identification for many of the mass graves and human remains to be exhumed and cremated or buried; Azucena's ashes were interred in the Plaza de Mayo itself.

Today, the Mothers are engaged in the struggle for human, political, and civil rights in Latin America and elsewhere.

Origins of the movement 
On April 30, 1977, Azucena Villaflor de De Vincenti and a dozen other mothers walked to the Plaza de Mayo in Argentina's capital city.

The original founders of the group were Azucena Villaflor de De Vincenti, Berta Braverman, Haydée García Buelas; María Adela Gard de Antokoletz, Julia, María Mercedes and Cándida Gard (four sisters); Delicia González, Pepa Noia, Mirta Acuña de Baravalle, Kety Neuhaus, Raquel Arcushin, and Senora De Caimi.

When the disappearances began, each mother thought that their child's disappearance was a single unique case. Initially, the lack of media attention on the disappearances led the mothers to believe that they were alone in their plight. As each mother visited prisons, hospitals, and police stations searching for their children, they each began to notice other mothers who were also searching for their children. The women began to realize that these disappearances were systematic, organized, and planned. Most of the women came from traditional working-class backgrounds and had limited knowledge of political processes. These women banded together to confront the regime as a unified front of mothers seeking answers about their missing children.  

These women shared the experience of each having had at least one child who had been 'taken' by the military government. The mothers declared that between 1970 and 1980, more than 30,000 individuals became "Desaparecidos" or "the disappeared." These people were erased from public records with no government traces of arrests or evidence of charges against them.

The women decided to risk a public protest, although gatherings of more than three people were banned, by linking arms in pairs, as if on a stroll just across the street from the presidential office building, the Casa Rosada (the Pink House). The mothers chose this site for its high visibility, and they were hoping for information on their whereabouts to recover imprisoned or to properly bury their children.

The "disappeared" were believed to have been abducted by agents of the Argentine government during the years known as the Dirty War (1976–1983). Those whose locations were found, often had been tortured and killed and bodies disposed of in rural areas or unmarked graves.

Becoming a movement 
As growing numbers joined weekly marches on Thursdays, the day the first few met, the Mothers also began an international campaign to defy the propaganda distributed by the military regime. This campaign brought the attention of the world to Argentina.

One year after the Mothers of the Plaza de Mayo was founded, hundreds of women were participating, gathering in the Plaza for weekly demonstrations. They found strength in each other by marching in public, and attracted some press. They made signs with photos of their children and publicized their children's names. They wore white headscarves embroidered with the names and dates of births of their lost children.

The government tried to trivialize their action calling them "las locas" (the madwomen).

As the number of disappeared grew, the movement grew, and the Mothers were getting international attention. They began to try to build pressure from outside governments against the Argentine dictatorship, by sharing the many stories of the "disappeared".

On 10 December 1977, International Human Rights Day, the Mothers published a newspaper advertisement with the names of their missing children. That same night, Azucena Villaflor (one of the original founders) was kidnapped from her home in Avellaneda by a group of armed men. She is reported to have been taken to the infamous ESMA torture centre, and from there on a "death flight" over the ocean. In-flight, the abducted were drugged, stripped, and flung into the sea or killed and thrown overboard.

Also an estimated 500 of the missing are the children who were born in concentration camps or prison to pregnant 'disappeared'  women; many of these babies were given in illegal adoptions to military families and others associated with the regime. Their birth mothers were generally believed to have been killed. The numbers are hard to determine due to the secrecy surrounding the abductions.

Global impact 

In 1978, when Argentina hosted the World Cup, the Mothers' demonstrations at the Plaza were covered by the international press in town for the sporting event.

Later when Adolfo Scilingo spoke at the National Commission on Disappeared People, he described how many prisoners were drugged and thrown out of planes to their deaths in the Atlantic Ocean. For years following the regime, from early 1978 onwards, residents who lived along the Río de la Plata have found human remains of those abducted, murdered and dumped at sea.

Some of the movement's most prominent supporters bodies were never found, such as French national Léonie Duquet. Duquet and her sister Alice Domon, both French nuns, were taken during the Dirty War. Their disappearance attracted international attention and outrage, with demands for a United Nations investigation of human rights abuses in the country. France demanded information on the sisters, but the Argentine government denied all responsibility for them.

In 2005, forensic anthropologists dug up some remains of bodies that had been buried in an unmarked grave after washing ashore (in late December 1977) near the beach resort of Santa Teresita, south of Buenos Aires. DNA testing identified among them Azucena Villaflor, Esther Careaga and María Eugenia Bianco, three pioneer Mothers of the Plaza who had  "disappeared". In December 2005, Azucena Villaflor's ashes were buried in the Plaza de Mayo itself.

Divisions and radicalization 

Never giving up their pressure on the regime, after the military gave up its authority to a civilian government in 1983, the Mothers of the Plaza de Mayo rekindled hopes that they might learn the fates of their children, pushing again for information.

Beginning in 1984, teams assisted by the American geneticist Mary-Claire King began to use DNA testing to identify remains, when bodies of the "disappeared" were found.

The government then conducted a national commission to collect testimony about the "disappeared", hearing from hundreds of witnesses. In 1985, it began prosecution of men indicted for crimes, beginning with the Trial of the Juntas, in which several high-ranking military officers were convicted and sentenced.

The military threatened a coup to prevent a widening of prosecutions. In 1986, Congress passed Ley de Punto Final, which stopped the prosecutions for some years.

But in 2003, Congress repealed the Pardon Laws, and in 2005 the Argentine Supreme Court ruled them unconstitutional. During the Kirchner's administration, prosecution of war crimes were re-opened. Former high-ranking military and security officers have been convicted and sentenced in new cases. Among the charges is the stealing of babies of the disappeared. The first major figure, Miguel Etchecolatz, was convicted and sentenced in 2006. Most of the members of the Junta were imprisoned for crimes against humanity.

With the Grandmothers of the Plaza de Mayo,  a group set up in 1977, the Mothers have identified 256 missing children who were adopted soon after being born to mothers in prison or camps who later "disappeared". Seven of the identified children have died. At beginning of 2018, 137 of those children, now grown adults, were found and were offered to meet their biological families.  Some Mothers and Grandmothers suffered disappointments when the grandchildren, now adults, did not want to know their hidden history, or refused to be tested. Parents who were judged in court to be guilty of adopting – or "appropriating" – the children of the disappeared, while knowing the truth about their origins, were susceptible to imprisonment.

In 1986, the Mothers split into two factions. One group, called the Mothers of the Plaza de Mayo-Founding Line, focused on legislation, the recovery of the remains of their children, and bringing ex-officials to justice. Hebe de Bonafini continued to lead a more radical faction under the name Mothers of the Plaza de Mayo Association. These mothers felt responsible for carrying on their children's political work and assumed the agenda that originally led to the disappearance of the dissidents. Unlike the Founding Line, the association refused government help or compensation. They pledged not to recognize the deaths of their children until the government would admit its fault.

A scholar of the movement, Marguerite Guzman Bouvard, wrote that the association faction wanted "a complete transformation of Argentine political culture" and "envisions a socialist system free of the domination of special interests". The Mothers Association is now backed by younger militants who support socialism.

In the wake of the September 11, 2001 attacks in the United States, Bonafini said "I was happy when I first heard the news, that for once they were the ones attacked, I'm not going to lie." and "being the U.S.A the most terrorist of all countries, throwing bombs everywhere around the world" but "felt bad for the innocent workers dead (because of the terrorist attack)" Her remarks led to some understandable criticisms in mainstream media.

Speaking for the Mothers, she rejected the investigations of alleged Iranian involvement in the 1994 AMIA Bombing (the terrorist attack on the AMIA Jewish community center), saying the CIA and Mossad were misleading the investigation; making a statement that they repudiate "the tragic attack, but respect for the victims and their families requires to investigate and do justice," without being "politically manipulated in the service of US interests."

'Final' March of Resistance

On 26 January 2006, members of the Madres de la Plaza de Mayo Association faction announced what they said was their final annual March of Resistance at the Plaza de Mayo, saying "the enemy isn't in the Government House anymore." They acknowledged the significance of President Néstor Kirchner's success in having the Full Stop Law (Ley de Punto Final) and the Law of Due Obedience repealed and declared unconstitutional. They said they would continue weekly Thursday marches in pursuit of action on other social causes.

The Founding Line faction announced that it would continue both the Thursday marches and the annual marches to commemorate the long struggle of resistance to the dictatorship.

Social involvement and political controversies
The association faction remained close to Kirchnerism. They established a newspaper (La Voz de las Madres), a radio station, and a university (Popular University of the Mothers of Plaza de Mayo).

The association at one time managed a federally funded housing program, Sueños Compartidos ("Shared Dreams"), which it founded in 2008. By 2011, Sueños Compartidos had completed 5,600 housing units earmarked for slum residents, and numerous other facilities in six provinces and the city of Buenos Aires.

Its growing budgets, which totaled around US$300 million allocated between 2008 and 2011 (of which $190 million had been spent), came under scrutiny. There was controversy when the chief financial officer of Sueños Compartidos, Sergio Schoklender, and his brother Pablo (the firm's attorney) were alleged to have embezzled funds. The Schoklender brothers had been convicted in 1981 for the murder of their parents and served 15 years in prison. After gaining Bonafini's confidence, they were managing the project's finances with little oversight from the Mothers of Plaza de Mayo or the program's licensor, the Secretary of Public Works. Their friendship with the association ended in June 2011 after Bonafini learned of irregularities in their handling of the group's finances. Following an investigation ordered by Federal Judge Norberto Oyarbide, the Secretary of Public Works canceled the Sueños Compartidos contract in August 2011. The outstanding projects were transferred to the Undersecretary of Housing and Urban Development.

Gender and motherhood
Issues of gender and motherhood were embedded in this movement. From its inception, the Mothers have been a strictly women-only organization,  as the mothers who lost their children were asserting their existence in the embroidery scarves, posters and demands for restoration. In the later political movement, the women felt it had to be women-only partly to ensure their voices and actions would not be lost in a male-dominated movement, and partly out of a belief that men would insist on a lengthy bureaucratic process rather than immediate action. They also believed that women were more tireless and had more emotional strength than men.

The gender separatism reaffirmed its status as a women's movement, although it also raised the question among some scholars of whether the movement truly challenged the notion of female passivity, and whether or not it would have sent a more powerful message to have had male family members involved as well.

The Mothers movement also raised questions of women in political space and the boundaries surrounding that space. The socially constructed gender roles prevalent in Argentine society restricted the arena of politics, political mobilisation, and confrontation to men. When the Mothers entered the Plaza de Mayo, a public space with historical significance, they politicised their role as mothers in society and redefined the values associated with both politics and motherhood itself. Although they did not challenge the patriarchal structure of Argentine society, by crossing boundaries into the masculinised political sphere, they expanded spaces of representation for Argentine women and opened the way for new forms of civic participation.

The Mothers were committed to child-centred politics, symbolised by the white scarves they wore on their heads. The scarves were originally nappies, or to represent diapers, and were embroidered with the names of their disappeared children or relatives. These headscarves identified the Mothers and symbolised children, and thus life, as well as hope and maternal care. The colour white also symbolised their refusal to wear a black mantilla and go into mourning. Children were at the heart of the movement, as the Mothers fought for a system that would respect human life and honour its preservation.

The Mothers of the Plaza de Mayo politicised and gave new value to the traditional role of mothers. They used motherhood to frame their protest, demanding the rights inherent to their role: to conserve life. They protested not only what had been done to their children, but also to themselves as mothers by taking them away. The heart of the movement was always "women's feelings, mother's feelings", according to Hebe de Bonafini. She further stated that "it was the strength of women, of mothers, that kept us going." The women's identity as mothers did not restrict them from participating or making an impact in a masculinised political space.

Their public protests contradicted the traditional, private domain of motherhood, and by mobilising themselves, they politicised their consciousness as women. They restricted themselves to a conservative representation of motherhood, which avoided controversy and attracted the support of international media. They refuted the concept that to be taken seriously or to be successful, a movement either has to be gender-neutral, or masculine: femininity and motherhood was integral to the Mothers' protest.

Grandmothers

The Grandmothers of the Plaza de Mayo is an organization which has the aim of finding the "stolen" babies, whose mothers were killed during the Junta's dictatorship in 1977. Its president is Estela Barnes de Carlotto. As of June 2019, their efforts have resulted in finding 130 grandchildren.

Awards and prizes 

In 1992, all members of the Mothers' association were awarded the Sakharov Prize for Freedom of Thought.
In 1997, María Adela Gard de Antokoletz was awarded the Gleitsman International Activist Award by the Gleitsman Foundation.
In 1997, the organization was awarded the Geuzenpenning in Vlaardingen, Netherlands
In 1999, the organization was awarded the United Nations Prize for Peace Education.
On 10 December 2003, the Grandmothers' president, Estela Barnes de Carlotto, was awarded the United Nations Prize in the Field of Human Rights.

Representation in other media 
The Official Story is a film related to the "stolen babies" cases.
Cautiva is another film related to the "stolen babies" cases.
An opera entitled Las Madres de la Plaza (2008) premiered in Leffler Chapel at Elizabethtown College in Pennsylvania. It was written in a collaboration of students, staff, and faculty of the school, headed up by James Haines and John Rohrkemper.
In an episode of Destinos set in Argentina, protagonist Raquel is told about the Mothers of the Plaza and sees a portion of a march.
 On "Little Steven" Van Zandt's 1984 release, "Voice of America", he pays tribute to Las Madres de Plaza de Mayo with his song, "Los Desaparecidos".
 Rock band U2 wrote a song, "Mothers of the Disappeared", inspired by, and in tribute to, their cause. The song appeared on their 1987 album The Joshua Tree.
 The Mothers of Plaza de Mayo (Spanish: Las Madres de la Plaza de Mayo) is a 1985 Argentine documentary film directed by Susana Blaustein Muñoz and Lourdes Portillo about the Mothers of the Plaza de Mayo. It was nominated for an Academy Award for Best Documentary Feature.
 The documentary Los Desaparecidos (The Disappeared, 2008) relives the horrors of Argentina’s Dirty War. The film follows follows a child of the disappeared and his involvement in Los Madres is touched on throughout the documentary.

See also

Black Sash
Films depicting Latin American military dictatorships
Ladies in White
Maria Eugenia Sampallo
Mourning Mothers
Saturday Mothers
Tiananmen Mothers
Women in Black
Jorge Rafael Videla
Estela de Carlotto
Laura Carlotto
Alice Domon
Léonie Duquet
Alfredo Astiz

References

Further reading
Mothers of the Disappeared, by Jo Fisher (1989).
Revolutionizing Motherhood: The Mothers of the Plaza de Mayo, by Marguerite Guzman Bouvard (1994).
Circle of Love Over Death: Testimonies of the Mothers of the Plaza de Mayo, by Matilde Mellibovsky, trans. by Maria & Matthew Proser (1997).
Searching for Life: The Grandmothers of the Plaza De Mayo and the Disappeared Children of Argentina, by Rita Arditti (1999).
A Lexicon of Terror: Argentina and the Legacies of Torture, by Marguerite Feitlowitz (1998)
"Las cenizas de Azucena, junto a la Pirámide", Página/12, 9 December 2005 .
 "Claiming the Public Space: The Mothers of Plaza de Mayo." by Susan Torre. In The Sex of Architecture, edited by Diana Agrest, Patricia Conway, and Lesile Weisman, 241–250. New York: Harry N. Adams, 1996.

External links

 Asociación Madres de Plaza de Mayo
 Madres de Plaza de Mayo – Línea Fundadora
 Asociación Abuelas de Plaza de Mayo

 
Buenos Aires
Political movements in Argentina
Dirty War
Women's organisations based in Argentina
Enforced disappearance
Argentine human rights activists
Organizations established in 1977
Sakharov Prize laureates
Missing people organizations